Music Bank: The Videos is a video release by rock band Alice in Chains containing all of the band's music videos (at the time). It was originally released on VHS in 1999 and was re-released in 2001 on DVD. The video has been certified gold by the RIAA with excess sales of 50,000 copies.

Overview
Interspersed between most of the videos are home video clips of the band on the road and in the studio. An early documentary of the band is also included which shows their life before signing to Columbia, and features performances of the early songs "Social Parasite", "I Can't Have You Blues" and "Queen of the Rodeo".

The audio for all songs was remixed by Toby Wright, with several songs featuring vocal tracks and guitar tracks not present on the albums and not heard elsewhere.

It is named after Ballard Music Bank - an abandoned warehouse that served as rehearsal space and often a living quarters for many bands in Seattle. Alice in Chains, Pearl Jam, Soundgarden, Green River, Mudhoney, Temple of the Dog, Mother Love Bone and many other acts used that space at some point.

Track listing
 "King 5 Documentary"
 "We Die Young" (Art Institute of Seattle Version)   
 "We Die Young"
 "Man in the Box"
 "Sea of Sorrow"
 "Would?"
 "Them Bones"
 "Angry Chair"
 "Rooster" (Uncut Version)
 "What the Hell Have I"
 "Down in a Hole"
 "No Excuses"
 "I Stay Away"
 "Grind" 
 "Heaven Beside You" 
 "Again"  
 "Over Now" (MTV Unplugged)   
 "Get Born Again"

Chart positions

Certifications

References

External links

Alice in Chains video albums
American documentary films
1999 video albums
Music video compilation albums
1999 compilation albums
Grunge compilation albums
Columbia Records compilation albums
Columbia Records video albums